Walter Sydney Vinnicombe (26 September 1888 – 27 October 1970) was an English actor and comedian. He worked in film, television and theatre.

Biography
Vinnicombe was born in Willesden, Middlesex and began working on the music hall stages in 1912 and at regular theatres in 1938 at the Theatre Royal, Drury Lane. His first film appearance was in 1928, and went on to appear in 213 other films. He worked up to his death, with his last television appearance in the comedy Doctor in the House in 1970.

Partial filmography

 Blighty (1927) - Drill Sergeant
 Boadicea (1927) - Officer in Roman Army (uncredited)
 The King's Highway (1927) - Police Chief
 Carry On (1927) - Andrews
 The Luck of the Navy (1927) - Stoker Clark
 The Guns of Loos (1928) - Sergeant
 Shooting Stars (1928) - Property Man
 Balaclava (1928) - Trooper Strang
 A Reckless Gamble (1928) - Wally
 You Know What Sailors Are (1928) - Seaman
 High Treason (1929) - Peace League Commissionaire (uncredited)
 The Adventures of Dick Turpin (1929) - Jonathan Wild
 Warned Off (1930) - Miles
 The Great Game (1930) - Joe Miller
 Kissing Cup's Race (1930) - Bookie
 The Sport of Kings (1931) - Panama Pete
 The Skin Game (1931) - Van Driver (uncredited)
 Tell England (1931) - Sergeant
 Never Trouble Trouble (1931) - Bill Hainton
 The Great Gay Road (1931) - Joe
 Shadows (1931) - Cripps
 Castle Sinister (1932) - Jorkins
 Heroes of the Mine (1932) - Bob
 Here's George (1932) - Foeman
 Illegal (1932) - The Bookie (uncredited)
 The Lucky Number (1932) - Bookmaker at Greyhound Stadium (uncredited)
 The Good Companions (1933) - Fred - Driver's Mate
 The Crime at Blossoms (1933) - Palmer
 Don Quixote (1933) - Gypsy King
 Falling for You (1933) - Publican (uncredited)
 Dora (1933 short) - PC William Petty
 Britannia of Billingsgate (1933) - Harry
 The Private Life of Henry VIII (1933) - Butcher in Kitchen (uncredited)
 Channel Crossing (1933) - Sailor (uncredited)
 Trouble (1933) - Chief Steward
 Marooned (1933) - Wilson
 Friday the Thirteenth (1933) - Bookmaker (uncredited)
 Up for the Derby (1933) - Bert Davis, Bookie (uncredited)
 Sorrell and Son (1933) - Buck
 The Scotland Yard Mystery (1934) - Detective Sergeant George
 The Fire Raisers (1934) - Price the Trainer (uncredited)
 Those Were the Days (1934) - Insp. Briggs
 Tiger Bay (1934) - Wally
 The Man I Want (1934) - Crook
 Passing Shadows (1934) - Sergeant
 Orders Is Orders (1934) - Regimental Sergeant Major
 Music Hall (1934) - Fred
 What Happened to Harkness? (1934) - Bullett
 Falling in Love (1934) - Boatman (uncredited)
 Virginia's Husband (1934) - Police Sergeant
 Badger's Green (1934) - Mr. Rogers
 The Scoop (1934) - Harry Humphries
 Crazy People (1934)
 A Glimpse of Paradise (1934) - Harry
 The Old Curiosity Shop (1934) - George (uncredited)
 The Perfect Flaw (1934) - Bert
 Once in a New Moon (1934) - Syd Parrott
 Borrow a Million (1934) - Bodgers
 The Public Life of Henry the Ninth (1935) - Landlord
 Brewster's Millions (1935) - Bookmaker (uncredited)
 Street Song (1935) - Wally
 That's My Uncle (1935) - Splinty Woods
 Dandy Dick (1935) - Police Constable Topping (uncredited)
 Death on the Set (1935) - Sergeant Crowther
 Where's George? (1935) - Ted Sloane
 Old Faithful (1935) - Joe Riley
 While Parents Sleep (1935) - Taxi Driver
 Crime Unlimited (1935) - Andrew Purvis (uncredited)
 No Monkey Business (1935) - Stage Hand (uncredited)
 Get Off My Foot (1935) - Tramp
 Off the Dole (1935) - Detective Brown
 Marry the Girl (1935) - Bookmaker
 His Majesty and Company (1935) - Bert Hicks
 Charing Cross Road (1935) - Langdon's Assistant (uncredited)
 Public Nuisance No. 1 (1936) - Hotel Doorman (uncredited)
 Ticket of Leave (1936) - Sergeant Knott
 Twice Branded (1936) - James Kaley (uncredited)
 A Wife or Two (1936)
 On Top of the World (1936) - Cardsharper
 Excuse My Glove (1936) - Hurricane Harry
 A Touch of the Moon (1936) - Police Constable
 Prison Breaker (1936) - Villars
 King of the Castle (1936) - Trout
 Not So Dusty (1936) - Dusty Gray
 The Interrupted Honeymoon (1936) - Police Constable
 The Man Who Could Work Miracles (1936) - Supt. Smithells
 Dusty Ermine (1936) - Thug (uncredited)
 Luck of the Turf (1936) - Bill Harris
 Hail and Farewell (1936) - Sergeant Major
 Men Are Not Gods (1936) - Gallery Attendant
 The Scarab Murder Case (1936) - Inspector Moor
 You Must Get Married (1936) - Chief Blow
 The Price of Folly (1937) - Man with Tip
 The Street Singer (1937) - Policeman
 Busman's Holiday (1937)  - Jeff Pinkerton
 The High Command (1937) - Crawford
 Farewell Again (1937) - Sgt. Maj. Billings
 The Man Who Made Diamonds (1937) - Alf Higgins
 Night Ride (1937) - Alf Higgins
 Talking Feet (1937) - (uncredited)
 Doctor Syn (1937) - Collyer's Bo'sun
 Missing, Believed Married (1937) - Flatiron Stubbs
 Captain's Orders (1937) - Johnstone
 Sam Small Leaves Town (1937) - Bus Passenger (uncredited)
 Holiday's End (1937) - Sergeant Yerbury
 Owd Bob (1938) - Bookmaker - Unlucky Joe - (US title: 'To the Victor')
 Bank Holiday (1938) - Arthur
 I See Ice (1938) - Train Conductor (uncredited)
 Quiet Please (1938) - Bill
 On Velvet (1938) - Harry Higgs
 Almost a Honeymoon (1938) - Bailiff
 Break the News (1938) - Prison Guard
 13 Men and a Gun (1938) - Hans
 Night Alone (1938) - Policeman
 Alf's Button Afloat (1938) - Sgt. Hawkins
 Pygmalion (1938) - First Bystander
 The Ware Case (1938) - Taxi Driver
 The Sky's the Limit (1938) - Commissionaire
 The Mind of Mr. Reeder (1939) - Lomer
 Inspector Hornleigh (1939) - Sam Holt aka Keyhole Charlie
 Sword of Honour (1939) - Pomeroy Brown
 Home from Home (1939) - Banks
 Poison Pen (1939) - Mr. Suggs
 Down Our Alley (1939) - Mr. Dunstable
 What Would You Do, Chums? (1939) - Tom
 Inspector Hornleigh on Holiday (1939) - Police Sergeant
 Pack Up Your Troubles (1940) - Sgt. Barker
 They Came by Night (1940) - Bugsie
 Return to Yesterday (1940) - Night Watchman
 Laugh It Off (1940) - Sergeant
 Band Waggon (1940) - Commissionaire
 Night Train to Munich (1940) - Fisherman (uncredited)
 Charley's (Big-Hearted) Aunt (1940) - The Buller
 The Flying Squad (1940) - Bargee (uncredited)
 Henry Steps Out (1940) - Wally
 Neutral Port (1940) - Fred
 Two Smart Men (1940) - Wally
 Gasbags (1941) - Sergeant-Major
 Old Mother Riley in Business (1941)
 Quiet Wedding (1941) - Magistrate
 Inspector Hornleigh Goes To It (1941) - Sergeant Major
 Cottage to Let (1941) - Evans
 Once a Crook (1941) - Warder
 Facing the Music (1941) - Briggs
 Jeannie (1941) - Porter
 I Thank You (1941) - Bill, The Fireman
 The Common Touch (1941) - 'Nobby'
 The Seventh Survivor (1942) - Bob Sutton
 Gert and Daisy's Weekend (1942) - Charlie Peters
 Bob's Your Uncle (1942) - Sgt. Brownfoot
 Banana Ridge (1942) - Police Officer
 Unpublished Story (1942) - Taxi Driver at Victoria Station
 Let the People Sing (1942) - Sam
 Salute John Citizen (1942) - Minor Role (uncredited)
 Sabotage at Sea (1942) - Tom (the steward)
 In Which We Serve (1942) - Uncle Fred
 We'll Smile Again (1942) - Head Porter
 Get Cracking (1943) - Sgt. Joe Preston
 The Life and Death of Colonel Blimp (1943) - Sergeant Clearing Debris (uncredited)
 Women in Bondage (1943) - German Soldier (uncredited)
 The Butler's Dilemma (1943) - Tom
 Death by Design (1943) - Sergeant Clinton
 One Exciting Night (1944) - Salvage Collector (uncredited)
 I Didn't Do It (1945) - Det Sgt. Carp
 Don Chicago (1945) - Sergeant
 Old Mother Riley at Home (1945) - Bouncer
 A Matter of Life and Death (1946) - ARP Warden (uncredited)
 Gaiety George (1946) - Commissionaire
 Wanted for Murder (1946) - Merry-Go-Round Barker
 George in Civvy Street (1946) - Sprout
 London Town (1946) - Constable (uncredited)
 Appointment with Crime (1946) - Joe Fisher - Garage Manager
 Green Fingers (1947) - Dawson
 Dusty Bates (1947) - Uncle Hank Miller
 The Ghosts of Berkeley Square (1947) - Foreman
 Brighton Rock (1948) - Bill (uncredited)
 Good-Time Girl (1948) - Bookie (uncredited)
 Calling Paul Temple (1948) - Spider Williams
 A Date with a Dream (1948) - Uncle
 The Guinea Pig (1948) - Uncle Percy
 River Patrol (1948) - The Guv
 The History of Mr. Polly (1949) - Customer
 Helter Skelter (1949) - BBC Commissionaire (uncredited)
 The Adventures of Jane (1949) - Customs Official
 The Twenty Questions Murder Mystery (1950) - Police Officer 'Tiny' White
 Salute the Toff (1952) - Bert Ebbutt
 Hammer the Toff (1952) - Bert Ebbutt
 My Wife's Lodger (1952) - Sergeant
 Will Any Gentleman...? (1953) - Bookmaker
 Thought to Kill (1953) - Bridger
 The Wedding of Lilli Marlene (1953) - Wally
 Josephine and Men (1955) - Landlord
 Private's Progress (1956) - Barman (uncredited)
 Not So Dusty (1956) - Porter
 Suspended Alibi (1957) - Porter
 The Naked Truth (1957) - Paunchy Old Man
 Morning Call (1957) - Wally, the tobacconist
 Too Many Crooks (1959) - Sergeant / Court Usher (uncredited)
 I'm All Right Jack (1959) - Workman
 Operation Cupid (1960) - Bookmaker
 The Challenge (1960) - Ticket Collector
 The Millionairess (1960) - Whelk Seller
 The Night We Got the Bird (1961) - Ticket collector
 Nothing Barred (1961) -Magazine Stall Proprietor - (billed as Walter Patch)
 Serena (1962) - Barman
 Danger by My Side (1962) - Factory Gatekeeper
 Sparrows Can't Sing (1963) - Watchman
 A Jolly Bad Fellow (1964) - Tom Pike
 The Bargee (1964) - Bargee (uncredited)
 The Comedy Man (1964) - Bar Manager (uncredited)
 Poor Cow (1967) - Customer in Pub

References

External links
 

1888 births
1970 deaths
English male film actors
English male silent film actors
English male stage actors
English male television actors
English male comedians
People from Willesden
20th-century English male actors
20th-century English comedians